Aleš Ježek (born June 25, 1990) is a Czech professional ice hockey player. He currently plays with KS Cracovia of the Polska Hokej Liga.

Ježek previously played 12 games in the Czech Extraliga for HC České Budějovice and 13 games in the Kontinental Hockey League for HC Lev Poprad.

References

External links

1990 births
Living people
HC Almaty players
Motor České Budějovice players
MKS Cracovia (ice hockey) players
HC CSK VVS Samara players
Czech ice hockey forwards
KLH Vajgar Jindřichův Hradec players
HC Lev Poprad players
BK Mladá Boleslav players
People from Tábor
IHC Písek players
HK Poprad players
HC Tábor players
TH Unia Oświęcim players
Zauralie Kurgan players
MsHK Žilina players
Sportspeople from the South Bohemian Region
Czech expatriate ice hockey players in Slovakia
Czech expatriate ice hockey players in Russia
Czech expatriate sportspeople in Poland
Czech expatriate sportspeople in Kazakhstan
Expatriate ice hockey players in Kazakhstan
Expatriate ice hockey players in Poland